The 2008 Terek Grozny season was the club's first season back in the Russian Premier League, after being relegated at the end of the 2005 season, and their second in their history. Terek finished the season in 10th position and reached the Round of 16 in the 2008–09 Russian Cup, where they were knocked out by reaching the Round of 32 where they were defeated by FC Moscow.

Squad

Transfers

Winter

In:

Out:

Summer

In:

Out:

Competitions

Russian Premier League

Results

League table

Russian Cup

Squad statistics

Appearances and goals

|-
|colspan="10"|Players away on loan:
|-
|colspan="10"|Players who appeared for Terek Grozny but left during the season:

|}

Goal Scorers

Disciplinary record

References

FC Akhmat Grozny seasons
Terek Grozny